Fading Parade is the fourth album from Papercuts, released in 2011 on the Sub Pop label.

Track listing
All songs written and composed by Jason Robert Quever, except "Do You Really Wanna Know" composed by Quever and Donovan Quinn.
"Do You Really Wanna Know" – 3:14
"Do What You Will" – 3:41
"I'll See You Later, I Guess" – 4:48
"Chills" – 4:20
"The Messenger" – 3:28
"White Are the Waves" – 3:17
"Wait Till I'm Dead" – 4:11
"Marie Says You've Changed" – 3:27
"Winter Daze" – 3:19
"Charades" – 3:57

Personnel
Jason Robert Quever – vocals, guitar, arranger, producer
Thom Monahan – producer, engineer, mixing
David Enos – autoharp, keyboards
Graham Hill – drums, arranger, sounds
Jeff Kleinsmith – art direction, design
Frankie Koeller – bass, arranger
Joe Lambert – mastering
Robert Madden – cover photo

References

2011 albums
Papercuts (band) albums
Sub Pop albums